is a Japanese anime screenwriter and manga writer, best known for authoring the manga series To Love Ru (2006–2009) and To Love Ru Darkness (2010–2017) alongside illustrator Kentaro Yabuki. Together the two manga series have over 16 million copies in circulation.

Career
In the 1980s and 1990s, Hasemi worked in the video game industry. Hasemi first met manga artist Kentaro Yabuki at preliminary meetings for the 2005 anime adaptation of Yabuki's Black Cat. When Hasemi told Yabuki that he was interested in writing an original manga, the artist told Hasemi he could contact him if he had any questions. But it was Yabuki who reached out to him to work on what would become To Love Ru. To Love Ru was serialized in Weekly Shōnen Jump from April 24, 2006, to August 31, 2009, and its sequel To Love Ru Darkness was serialized in Jump Square from October 4, 2010, to March 4, 2017. Both series received multiple anime adaptations and have been released in North America.

In the December 2020 issue of ASCII Media Works' Dengeki Maoh manga magazine, it was announced that Hasemi and artist Wise Speak would launch a new manga series titled GT-giRl on November 27, 2020.

Works

Video games
Zero4 Champ – vehicle illustration
Zero4 Champ II – vehicle illustration
The Great Battle Pocket – character design
Mini 4 Boy – character design, planning
Mini 4 Boy II – character design, scenario writer
Little Busters Q – screenplay, planning
Ojamajo Adventure: Naisho no Mahou – screenplay, planning
Nuga-Cel!
Motto Nuga-Cel! 
Tengi Sosei Strike Girls / Gorgeous Maiden Girls Striker – scenario supervision
Honey x Blade / Honey x Blade 2 – scenario supervision
Detariki Z Tokubetsu Bōei-kyoku Taiin no Nichijō – scenario supervision

Anime
Sugar Sugar Rune – Script (episodes 5, 12, 21, and 36)
Black Cat – Script (episodes 3, 4, 5, 9, 13, 14, 18, and 19)
Powerpuff Girls Z – Script (episodes 2, 12, 23, 25, 41, and 48)
Pinky:St – Series Composition
Moetan – Series Composition 
To Love Ru (TV) – Original creator
To Love Ru (OVA) – Original creator
Motto To Love Ru – Original creator
To Love Ru Darkness (TV) – Original creator
To Love Ru Darkness (OVA) – Original creator
To Love Ru Darkness 2nd (TV) – Original creator
To Love Ru Darkness 2nd (OVA) – Original creator

Manga
  (with Kentaro Yabuki; 2006–2009 Shueisha) – Story
  (with Kentaro Yabuki; 2010–2017 Shueisha) – Story
  (with Kotarō Shōno; 2013–2014 Gakken Plus) – Story
 GT-giRl (with Wise Speak; 2020–ongoing ASCII Media Works) – Story

References

External links

Anime screenwriters
Manga writers
Living people
Year of birth missing (living people)